Winnipeg was a provincial electoral district in the Canadian province of Manitoba, which was represented in the Legislative Assembly of Manitoba. Consisting of the city of Winnipeg, the district originally existed from 1870 to 1883, returning a single member to the assembly. The district was named Winnipeg and St. John for the election of 1870 only, and Winnipeg thereafter.

In 1883, it was divided into the new districts of Winnipeg North and Winnipeg South; a third district of Winnipeg Centre was created in 1888.

In 1920, the district was reconstituted as a multiple member district covering the whole city of Winnipeg. This city-wide district returned ten members to the legislature who were all elected citywide through Single transferable vote form of proportional representation. 

The district existed in this form until 1949, when the district was divided into three districts, Winnipeg North, South and Centre. Each of the three districts continued to use STV. They each elected four members until 1958, when all districts in the province reverted to conventional first-past-the-post voting.

List of representatives (1870-1883)

Elected MLAs during Winnipeg's 10-member period (1920-1949)

Dixon resigned in 1923. seat left empty until next election.

Election results

1870 general election

1874 by-election

1874 general election

1878 general election

1879 general election

1880 by-election

References

See also List of Manitoba general elections

Former provincial electoral districts of Manitoba
Politics of Winnipeg